Little Tiger of Canton, also known as Cub Tiger From Kwang Tung, is a 1973 Hong Kong martial arts action film directed by Chu Mu and starring Jackie Chan. Chan was 17 when footage for the film was shot in 1971, and it is considered to be his first starring role. A re-edited version of the film, Master with Cracked Fingers, was later released in 1979.

Background 
Cub Tiger From Kwang Tung was filmed in Hong Kong in 1971, but only saw a limited cinema release two years later. The small independent release was shelved after its brief run and never received an international release. In the late 1979, in the wake of Chan's success in Snake in the Eagle's Shadow and Drunken Master (both 1978), the film re-emerged at Hong Kong cinemas, in a poorly re-edited version with some newer footage of Dean Shek and Yuen Siu Tien spliced in, along with a rather obvious Jackie Chan double.

The amalgamated footage was sold to US film producer Dick Randall, who dubbed and repackaged it, and gave it an alternative title, Master with Cracked Fingers. The rights were subsequently sold to 21st Century Distribution who gave this version of the film a brief run in US cinemas in 1981, under the title Snake Fist Fighter.

Since Chan became more popular in the West, particularly after the US release of Rumble in the Bronx (1996), the repackaged film has seen numerous VHS and DVD releases from a wide variety of film distributors in the US and UK.

The original film, Cub Tiger From Kwang Tung was finally given an international DVD release for the first time in 2007. It was released in the UK (DVD is 0 region) on Showbox Home Entertainment's Rarescope label. This is the complete original 85 minute film, as it was released in Hong Kong in 1973, without edits and additions. It contains the original Mandarin soundtrack and imbedded English/Chinese subtitles. Due to the poor quality of the print, some of the subtitles are chopped from the foot of the screen, so the DVD contains an additional set of subtitles which appear whenever the originals are cropped or missing.

Plot 
Hsiao Hu (Jackie Chan) has been secretly training in martial arts, as his father (Tien Feng) has forbidden him. Later, some local store owners ask Ah to help protect them from a greedy Chinese extortion ring. Ah discovers that the crime lord behind the extortion had killed his father years before and is determined for revenge.

Cast

See also 
 Master with Cracked Fingers
 Jackie Chan filmography
 List of Hong Kong films
 List of martial arts films

References

External links 

 

1973 films
1970s action films
1970s martial arts films
Hong Kong action films
1970s Mandarin-language films
Hong Kong martial arts films
Kung fu films
Wushu films
1970s Hong Kong films